"Bled for Days" is the third single from the heavy metal band Static-X's debut album, Wisconsin Death Trip. It has appeared on several soundtracks, including the Universal Soldier: The Return and Bride of Chucky soundtracks. The music video for "Bled for Days" was recorded at a Static-X live show and mixed with the album version of the song. When Nick Oshiro auditioned for the band, the first song they played was "Bled for Days" and after they were done they knew they were going to recruit him.

Chart performance

References

2000 singles
Static-X songs
1999 songs
Warner Records singles
Songs written by Koichi Fukuda
Songs written by Tony Campos
Songs written by Ken Jay
Songs written by Wayne Static